Manuel Baiget (4 August 1945 – 31 July 2007) was a Spanish sailor. He competed in the Dragon event at the 1968 Summer Olympics.

References

External links
 

1945 births
2007 deaths
Spanish male sailors (sport)
Olympic sailors of Spain
Sailors at the 1968 Summer Olympics – Dragon
Sportspeople from Palma de Mallorca